Emmanuel Kwame Duut (born 6 June 1959) is a Ghanaian politician and a member of the Fifth Parliament of the Fourth Republic of Ghana representing the Bunkpurugu-Yungoo Constituency in the Northern Region of Ghana.

Early life and education 
Duut was born on 6 June 1959 in Najong, in the Northern Region of Ghana. He attended the University of Education, Winneba (UEW) in 2004 and obtained Bachelor of Education (B.Ed.).

Career 
He was the Assistant Headmaster for the Bunkpurugu-Yunyoo Senior High School and a member of parliament for the Bunkpurugu-Yunyoo Constituency (2009-2013).

Politics 
He was first elected into parliament on the ticket of the National Democratic Congress(NDC) during the December 2008 Ghanaian general election as the member of Parliament for the Bunkpurugu-Yunyoo Constituency in the Northern Region of Ghana. During the 2008 election, he polled 9,205 votes out of the 32,078 valid votes cast representing 28.7%. He contested again in the 2012 Ghanaian general election and was defeated by Solomon Namliit Boar, a member of the New Patriotic Party who obtained 10,829 votes representing 38.85%. He served only one term as a parliamentarian.

Personal life 
He is married with nine children. He is a Christian and a member of the Catholic Church.

References 

1959 births
Living people
Ghanaian Roman Catholics
National Democratic Congress (Ghana) politicians
University of Education, Winneba alumni
Ghanaian MPs 2009–2013
Ghanaian schoolteachers
People from Northern Region (Ghana)